The Kronenburg B.V. company is a fire-service vehicles manufacturer, based in Wanroij, Netherlands. The company was founded by the Kronenburg family in 1823.

Kronenburg B.V. supplies thousands of fire trucks to many countries. Its trucks serve in military and civil airports, petrochemical industries and municipal fire brigades.

References

External links
 www.kronenburgfire.com
 http://album.sixappealwheel.org
 http://www.fire-engine-photos.com

Companies based in North Brabant
Manufacturing companies established in 1823
Dutch brands
Emergency services equipment makers
Fire service vehicles